The 2013 Supertaça de Angola (26th edition) was contested by Recreativo do Libolo, the 2012 Girabola champion and Petro de Luanda, the 2012 Angola cup winner. It was the last such competition to be played in a two leg format. On home court, Petro beat Libolo 1–0 to secure their 1st title as the away match in Calulo ended in a draw.

Match details

First Leg

Second Leg

See also
 2012 Angola Cup
 2012 Girabola
 Petro de Luanda players
 Recreativo do Libolo players

References

Supertaça de Angola
Super Cup